Juan Pablo Krilanovich (born 7 April 2002) is an Argentine professional footballer who plays as a winger for Lanús.

Club career
Krilanovich began his youth career at the age of six with Cultural Guernica; a town that he grew up in, having been born in Adrogué. In 2008, Krilanovich was signed by Lanús. He progressed through their youth ranks for twelve years, prior to making the move into Luis Zubeldía's first-team squad in 2020. After going unused on the substitute's bench for matches with Talleres, Newell's Old Boys and, in the Copa Sudamericana, Independiente, Krilanovich played eighty-six minutes of a victory on the road versus Aldosivi in the Copa de la Liga Profesional on 13 December 2020; he was subbed off for fellow debutant Kevin Lomónaco.

International career
Krilanovich represented Argentina at U15 and U17 level. He scored twice, versus Chile and invitees Czech Republic, as they won the 2017 South American U-15 Championship on home soil. Krilanovich later netted one goal, against Paraguay, in five appearances at the 2019 South American U-17 Championship in Peru, as they won the trophy and qualified for the FIFA U-17 World Cup in Brazil; where he scored, versus Cameroon, across two matches.

Career statistics

Honours
Argentina U15
South American U-15 Championship: 2017

Argentina U17
South American U-17 Championship: 2019

Notes

References

External links

2002 births
Living people
People from Adrogué
Argentine people of Croatian descent
Argentine footballers
Argentina youth international footballers
Association football forwards
Argentine Primera División players
Club Atlético Lanús footballers
Sportspeople from Buenos Aires Province